Westwood is an area of the Scottish new town East Kilbride.  It was name-checked by one of its former inhabitants, Roddy Frame of Aztec Camera, in the song "Somewhere In My Heart". Part of the song's lyrics proclaim "From Westwood to Hollywood, The one thing that's understood, Is that you can't buy time, But you can sell your soul, And the closest thing to heaven is rock and roll".

Westwood is home to one secondary School, which under South Lanarkshire Council's Schools modernisation programme, was the first of the new schools in the town to be built, near to the site of the original school building.  It also boasts two primary schools, East Milton Primary School based in Vancouver Drive and Canberra Primary School which is located on Belmont Drive.

Westwood like its other neighbourhoods has a parade of shops, being based in Westwood Square.

Westwood is home to Westwood Amateur Football Club who play in the Strathclyde Saturday Morning Amateur Football League.

References

Areas of East Kilbride